Gods & Monsters is the seventh album by the electronic/trance band Juno Reactor. The album was released on April 22, 2008, though Metropolis began shipping it in early April.

Track listing 
 "Inca Steppa" – 7:45
 "Tokyo Dub" – 7:07
 "Las Vegas Future Past" – 5:59
 "Mind of the Free" – 6:10
 "Immaculate Crucifixion" – 7:40
 "City of the Sinful" – 4:43
 "Tanta Pena" – 5:50
 "The Perfect Crime (Superman)" – 6:24
 "Pretty Girl" – 5:27

Two tracks in the album are remixes of tracks originally from the video game The Matrix: Path of Neo. A soundtrack was planned for release in January 2006, but was delayed until March 2006, before the soundtrack release was scrapped. The two tracks are:
 "City of the Sinful" was originally used in the video game as "Ever Had a Dream?"
 "Immaculate Crucifixion" was originally "Multiple Smiths", the track played during the Burly Brawl.

Personnel 
 Artwork Design - Squalis
 Artwork Illustration - Koji Morimoto
 Bass - Dr. Das
 Drum Programming - Ramjac
 Drum Programming, Guitar, Keyboards, Engineer - Ben Watkins
 Additional Drums - Django
 Drums, Percussion - Greg Ellis, Mabi Thobejane
 Engineer - Adz, Chris Lewis
 Guitar - Sugizo
 Keyboards - Scarlet
 Sonar - Rudy Koppl
 Sound Forager - Xavier Morel
 Piano - Mike Garson
 Trumpet in Las Vegas Future Past - Byron Wallen
 Guitar in City Of The Sinful - Steve Stevens
 Darduk Flute, ney and zorn in Tanta Pena - Tigran Aleksanyan
 Acoustic guitar in Perfect Crime - Eduardo Niebla
 Vocals in Perfect Crime and Pretty Girl - Ben Watkins
 Vocals in Inca Steppa, Tokyo Dub, Mind Of The Free and City Of The Sinful - Ghetto Priest
 Female vocals in Inca Steppa, Perfect Crime and Pretty Girl - Taz Alexander
 Vocals in City Of The Sinful - Angelica
 Vocals in Tanta Pena - Yasmin Levy
 Written-By, Producer - Juno Reactor

References

External links
 JunoReactor.com profile of Gods & Monsters

2008 albums
Juno Reactor albums
Trance albums